Bowness High School is a public school in Calgary, Alberta, Canada, which teaches grades 10 through 12.  It is operated by the Calgary Board of Education.

The school was founded in 1956 as a junior and senior high school to serve the town of Bowness .  In 1964 the town was annexed by Calgary.  No longer having a junior high component, the school now serves several Calgary communities in addition to Bowness.

Some of the programs of the school include Pre-Engineering, Career and Technology Studies (CTS) and High Performance Athlete Development (HPAD). Bowness has an award-winning band program.

In 2016 Bowness officially opened its newly constructed southern wing of the school. This newly expanded wing comprises six new classrooms, a fully functioning culinary arts kitchen/cafeteria, fitness centre and Cosmetology; along with various common learning areas and new main foyer.

Notable alumni 
Nick Blevins - Professional Rugby player - Team Canada
Devan Dubnyk - NHL Goalie - Edmonton Oilers, Nashville Predators
Amanda Forbis - Film maker won many awards including Golden Palm at the Cannes Film Festival for the short film When the Day Breaks in 1999.
Ryan Sceviour - Professional football player - Calgary Stampeders
Patti Stiles (née Atfield) - Actress internationally known for her work in improvisation.

References

External links 
Official website
Pre-Engineering Program
High Performance Athlete Development (HPAD)

Educational institutions established in 1956
High schools in Calgary
1956 establishments in Alberta